Mary Clarkson (born 1 December 1962) is the former Lord Mayor of Oxford, England. She has been the City Councillor for Marston since 1998, representing the Labour Party.

Clarkson attended St John's College, Oxford, studying English Language and Literature. She previously worked in human resources, management consultancy and employment policy research. She served as Lord Mayor in 2009–10, and currently sits on the Board of Oxford Playhouse.

References

1964 births
Living people
Lord Mayors of Oxford
Members of Oxford City Council
Labour Party (UK) councillors
Place of birth missing (living people)
Women councillors in England
Women mayors of places in England
Alumni of St John's College, Oxford